Morpho helenor, the Helenor blue morpho or common blue morpho, is a Neotropical butterfly found throughout Central and South America from Mexico to Argentina. It is a species group that may or may not be several species. Many subspecies have been described.

Biology
The larvae of subspecies Morpho helenor achillaena have been recorded as feeding on Genipa americana, Inga, Machaerium oblongifolium and Platymiscium.

Subspecies
Listed alphabetically:
M. h. achillaena (Hübner, [1823])
M. h. achillides C. & R. Felder, 1867
M. h. anakreon Fruhstorfer, 1910
M. h. charapensis Le Moult & Réal, 1962
M. h. coelestis Butler, 1866
M. h. cortone Fruhstorfer, 1913
M. h. corydon Guenée, 1859
M. h. guerrerensis Le Moult & Réal, 1962
M. h. helenor (Cramer, 1776)
M. h. insularis Fruhstorfer, 1912
M. h. leontius C. & R. Felder, 1867
M. h. macrophthalmus Fruhstorfer, 1913
M. h. maculata Röber, 1903
M. h. marajoensis Le Moult & Réal, 1962
M. h. marinita Butler, 1872
M. h. montezuma Guenée, 1859
M. h. narcissus Staudinger, 1887
M. h. octavia Bates, 1864
M. h. papirius Hopffer, 1874
M. h. peleides Kollar, 1850 now also described in Morpho peleides
M. h. peleus Röber, 1903
M. h. pindarus Fruhstorfer, 1910
M. h. popilius Hopffer, 1874
M. h. rugitaeniatus Fruhstorfer, 1907
M. h. telamon Röber, 1903
M. h. theodorus Fruhstorfer, 1907
M. h. tucupita Le Moult, 1925
M. h. ululina Le Moult & Réal, 1962
M. h. violaceus Fruhstorfer, 1912
M. h. zonaras Fruhstorfer, 1912

Gallery

Morpho helenor helenor

References

Le Moult (E.) & Réal (P.) (1962-1963). Les Morpho d'Amérique du Sud et Centrale, Editions du cabinet entomologique E. Le Moult, Paris.
Smart, Paul (1976). The Illustrated Encyclopedia of the Butterfly World in Color. London, Salamander: Encyclopedie des papillons. Lausanne, Elsevier Sequoia (French language edition).   page 237 fig. 6 as hyacinthus (Mexico), fig. 8 as montezuma Guen, underside (Honduras), page 237 fig. 10 as achillaena f. violacea Fruhstorfer, underside (Brazil), fig. 11 as achillaena f. violacea Fruhstorfer, upperside (Brazil)

External links
"Morpho Fabricius, 1807" at Markku Savela's Lepidoptera and Some Other Life Forms
Butterflies of America Images of type and other specimens.
Taxonomy Browser Upperside and underside photographs.

helenor
Fauna of Brazil
Nymphalidae of South America
Butterflies of Central America